General Sir Frederick Dobson Middleton  (4 November 1825 – 25 January 1898) was a British general noted for his service throughout the Empire and particularly in the North-West Rebellion in Canada.

Imperial Military career 
Educated at Maidstone Grammar School and the Royal Military College, Sandhurst, Middleton was commissioned into the 58th Regiment of Foot in 1842.

He served in the New Zealand Wars and in 1845, he was mentioned in dispatches for his part in the capture of the stronghold of Māori chief Te Ruki Kawiti.

In 1848 he transferred to the 96th Regiment of Foot in India and took part in the suppression of the Indian Mutiny in which campaign he was recommended for, but not awarded, the Victoria Cross. He went on to be Commandant of the Royal Military College, Sandhurst, in 1879.

Canadian military career 
He was appointed General Officer Commanding the Militia of Canada in 1884.

Middleton just happened to be on the scene when in 1885 a group of Métis launched the North-West Rebellion. Middleton was named commander of the main force used to put it down. His force was victorious in the Battle of Batoche, which ended the rebellion.

Middleton had travelled from Ottawa to Winnipeg to evaluate Military District 10, which covered the Prairies, as the officer in charge of District 10 had just been dismissed on the account of his alcoholism. This was the same day as the Battle of Duck Lake, the opening round of the Rebellion. Métis fighters defeated a force of the North-West Mounted Police there.

Though Middleton was elderly and cautious, his response to the news of Duck Lake was swift. That same day, he departed Winnipeg on a train bound for Qu'Appelle with a company of Manitoba militia.

The major difficulty for Middleton was mobilizing the militia forces of Ontario and Quebec. They had to travel on the only-partially-completed Canadian Pacific Railway. This required the men to march through the snow and rocks of northern Ontario to reach Winnipeg, the headquarters of the Canadian forces.

Canadian historian Desmond Morton described Middleton as an experienced soldier who "mixed common sense and pomposity in equal measure". His plan was to take Batoche, the capital of the Métis exovedate (council), which he predicated would end the rebellion. As the rebellion had shaken international confidence in the credit-worthiness of Canada, Middleton was under immense pressure from Prime Minister Sir John A. Macdonald, to end the rebellion as soon as possible.

The militiamen arriving in Winnipeg were mostly untrained, and Middleton had to train them as they marched to the front.

On 6 April 1885, Middleton set off on a march to Batoche. On 23 April 1885, the Métis and Cree under Gabriel Dumont ambushed the Canadians at Fish Creek. Despite Middeton's orders, Colonel William Dillon Otter after reaching Battleford, set out to do battle with the Cree, and was defeated by Chief Poundmaker at the Battle of Cut Knife Hill; only the latter's unwillingness to have his warriors take advantage of the rout saved the Canadians from being annihilated. Middleton planned to advance on Batoche with river steamers owned by the Hudson's Bay Company bringing up supplies along the South Saskatchewan river, and as steamers were not available at first, Middleton chose to wait. Despite their own panic at Fish Creek, many of the militiamen came to curse "Old Fred" as too timid, but Middleton had sound reasons for not wishing to advance without a means of resupply. Middleton knew that the Métis and the Cree were expert horsemen and believed they would ambush any supply wagons, which is why he preferred to bring up supplies and reinforcements via the river.

On 5 May 1885, the streamer Northcote was ready and Middleton set off for Batoche. On 9 May 1885, the Northcote was stopped by a cable that Dumont had laid across the river outside of Batoche, and its American captain turned back when the boat came under fire. The Northcote was a diversion to draw out the Métis and at the same time, the Field Force under Middleton arrived at Batoche. Seeing his troops beginning to panic again, Middleton ordered his wagons to be drawn into a circle to form a strong defensive position. On 11 May 1885, Middleton observed that the outnumbered Métis and Cree had to rush from position to position on the Prairies and on the morning of 12 May 1885, Middleton ordered his artillery would open fire on his opponents to pin them down while his infantry would advance. Nothing had happened as infantry claimed not to hear the fire of the artillery; after accusing his men of cowardice, Middleton attacked again on the afternoon and with a battalion commanded by a Conservative MP, Colonel Arthur Williams leading the attack. Inspired by the example of Williams's battalion, other battalions began to charge forward. Shouting enthusiastically, the Canadians raced down from the hill, and disheartened Métis and Cree were soon defeated.

Morton described Middleton as cautious, but highly professional officer who was a better tactician than Dumont, who brought the war to a swift conclusion in a manner that was much less bloodier than it could have been. For his service in the war, Middleton was knighted by Queen Victoria in 1885. He also received the thanks of the Parliament of Canada and the sum of $20,000.

He resigned as head of the militia in 1890 when a select committee report of the House of Commons criticized him for the misappropriation of furs from a Scotch-Indian Charles Bremner and his Cree wife Emily Bremner, during the rebellion.
There were also other criticisms of Middleton's command during the rebellion, such as his hesitancy to unleash the Canadian militia troops to assault the Métis positions at Batoche, and unfair treatment and poor maintenance accorded the troops under his command. Returning to England, he was made Master of the Jewel Office.

Family 

Frederick Dobson Middleton married, as his first wife, Mary Emily Hassall.

He married in February 1870 as his second wife, Marie Cecile Eugénie Doucet, daughter of Theodore Doucet, N.P., of Montreal. She was born in Montreal in 1846, and was educated at the Convent of the Sacred Heart, Sault-au-Recollet. The couple had two sons and a daughter. She died at Yateley, Hants, England, 1 November 1899.

References

Bibliography 
 

1825 births
1898 deaths
Military personnel from Belfast
British Army generals
Canadian generals
British military personnel of the Indian Rebellion of 1857
British military personnel of the New Zealand Wars
Commandants of Sandhurst
Companions of the Order of the Bath
Graduates of the Royal Military College, Sandhurst
Knights Commander of the Order of St Michael and St George
People of the North-West Rebellion
Commanders of the Canadian Army
58th Regiment of Foot officers
96th Regiment of Foot officers
Worcestershire Regiment officers
People educated at Maidstone Grammar School
Masters of the Jewel Office